The Wrecks of HMS Erebus and HMS Terror National Historic Site is a National Historic Site of Canada near King William Island in the northern Nunavut territory. The site is jointly managed by Parks Canada and the local Inuit. Public access to the site is not permitted.

History 

Geography 
The site consists of two separate areas, one enclosing each wreck, with perimeter coordinates:

Archeology 

As of 2019, the wrecks are the subject of archeological research undertaken by Parks Canada. Parks Canada is also handling the  documentation and conservation of artefacts removed from the wrecks.

Ownership 
Under international maritime law, as Royal Navy ships, the wrecked ships are the property of the United Kingdom. However, in 1997 before either wreck was discovered but in the belief that the wrecks must be within Canadian waters, the United Kingdom had entered into a non-binding Memorandum of Understanding with Canada, that Canada could own the wrecks. In 1999, Canada created the new territory of Nunavut as part of the Nunavut Land Claims Agreement with the Inuit. Part of that agreement gave the Inuit the ownership of archaeological sites and artifacts within Nunavut's boundaries.

After the wrecks were discovered, there was greater need to clarify all parties' rights in relation to the wrecks. In April 2019, the United Kingdom and Canada formally agreed that the original 65 artefacts removed from the wrecks would belong to the United Kingdom, but that the wrecks themselves and further artefacts removed would belong to Canada and the Inuit Heritage Trust with the exception of gold which would belong to the United Kingdom and any human remains would be repatriated to the United Kingdom. In return Canada would not seek payment from the United Kingdom for their costs incurred in discovering the wrecks and in removing and conserving the artefacts. In relation to the Inuit rights, the Canadian Government (represented by Parks Canada) and the Kitikmeot Inuit Association are currently negotiating an agreement that will establish a visitor centre  at Gjoa Haven as an extension of the existing Nattilik Heritage Centre.

Public access 

Public access to the site is not allowed with the exception of Inuit, who are permitted to hunt and fish within the protected area. To protect the site from the public, Inuit from Gjoa Haven work as guardians, camping near the wreck sites to monitor access to the sites.

References 

National Historic Sites in Nunavut
Franklin's lost expedition
Co-managed protected areas